Sally Ann Walker  is an Australian university administrator and lawyer. She served as the fifth Vice-Chancellor and President of Deakin University (2003–2010) and was the first woman to be appointed to the position.

Early life and education
She studied at Warrnambool College and then received a scholarship to attend Melbourne Girls' Grammar School and subsequently earned a place in the Law School of The University of Melbourne, from which she graduated with a Bachelor of Laws degree with First Class Honours. In her graduating class, she was placed first and was awarded the Supreme Court Prize, the Anna Brennan Memorial Prize and the inaugural Joan Rosanove Memorial Prize. She later obtained a Master of Laws degree from the same institution.

Law career
In 1978 she became an Associate to Justice Sir Keith Aickin of the High Court of Australia.  The following year, she became an Associate Partner with Gillotts Solicitors (now part of Minter Ellison) in Melbourne.  In April 1993, she became First Academic Secretary of the Victorian Attorney-General's Law Reform Advisory Council.

Academic career
In 1980, she joined University of Melbourne and in 1993 became Hearn Professor of Law and was subsequently appointed to the positions of: President of the Academic Board, Pro-Vice Chancellor, and, until 2003, Senior Deputy Vice-Chancellor. In 2003 she was appointed as Vice-Chancellor and President of Deakin University, positions she held until July 2010.

In 2010 Deakin University conferred upon her an honorary degree of Doctor of Laws for her distinguished contribution to Deakin University, to legal education and scholarship and to higher education in general. She is a Professor Emeritus of both Deakin University and the University of Melbourne. In the 2011 Queen's Birthday Honours list, she was made a Member of the Order of Australia.

Personal life
Walker married doctor and former Chief Medical Officer of Australia Brendan Murphy in 1979 and has two sons.

References

Living people
University of Melbourne women
Year of birth missing (living people)
People educated at Melbourne Girls Grammar
People from Warrnambool
Academic staff of Deakin University
University of Melbourne alumni
Academic staff of the University of Melbourne
Members of the Order of Australia